Senator Lasee may refer to:

Alan Lasee (born 1937), Wisconsin State Senate
Frank Lasee (born 1961), Wisconsin State Senate